Kızılkapı   is a small village in Bor district of Niğde Province, Turkey. At  it is situated in the northern slopes of Toros Mountains. The population of Kızılkapı  was 70 as of 2011.

References 

Villages in Bor District, Niğde